Motorola Moto is a range of Android mobile devices manufactured by Motorola Mobility, a subsidiary of Lenovo. The Moto brand is also used and marketed for certain public-safety products from Motorola Solutions and by Motorola brand licensees on certain home products and mobile accessories.

Smartphones 
After Google purchased Motorola Mobility in 2012, they introduced a simplified range of smartphones in 2013. In 2016, the Moto X line was discontinued and replaced with Moto Z. The Moto X line came back in 2017.

Moto C
Moto C is low-end.
Moto C (2017)
Moto C Plus (2017)

Moto E
Moto E is low-end.
Moto E (1st generation) (2014)
Moto E (2nd generation) (2015)
Moto E3 (2016) 
Moto E3 Power (2016)
Moto E4 (2017)
Moto E4 Plus (2017)
Moto E5 (2018)
Moto E5 Play (2018)
Moto E5 Plus (2018)
Moto E6 (2019)
Moto E6 Play (2019)
Moto E6 Plus (2019)
Moto E6s (2020)
Moto E (2020)
Moto E7 (2020)
Moto E7 Plus (2020)
Moto E6i (2021)
Moto E7 Power (2021)
Moto E7i Power (2021)
Moto E20 (2021)
Moto E30 (2021)
Moto E40 (2021)
Moto E32 (2022)

Motorola Edge
Motorola Edge is mid range to high-end.
Motorola Edge (2020)
Motorola Edge+ (2020)
Motorola Edge S (2021)
Motorola Edge 20 Lite (2021)
Motorola Edge 20 Fusion (2021)
Motorola Edge 20 (2021)
Motorola Edge 20 Pro/Edge S Pro (2021)
Motorola Edge (2021)
Motorola Edge S30 (2022)
Motorola Edge X30 (2022)
Motorola Edge+ (2022)
Motorola Edge 30 (2022)
Motorola Edge 30 Pro (2022)

Moto G

Moto G is mid-range.
Moto G (1st generation) (2013)
Moto G (2nd generation) (2014)
Moto G (3rd generation) (2015)
Moto G4 (2016)
Moto G4 Play (2016)
Moto G4 Plus (2016)
Moto G5 (2017)
Moto G5 Plus (2017)
Moto G5S (2017) 
Moto G5S Plus (2017)
Moto G6 (2018) 
Moto G6 Play (2018)
Moto G6 Plus (2018)
Moto G7 (2019)
Moto G7 Play (2019)
Moto G7 Power (2019)
Moto G7 Plus (2019)
Moto G8 Play (2019)
Moto G8 Plus (2019)
Moto G8 (2020)
Moto G8 Power (2020)
Moto G8 Power Lite (2020)
Moto G Fast (2020)
Moto G Power (2020)
Moto G Stylus/G Pro (2020)
Moto G 5G Plus (2020)
Moto G9 Play (2020)
Moto G9 Plus (2020)
Moto G9 Power (2020)
Moto G 5G (2021)
Moto G Pure (2021)
Moto G Play (2021)
Moto G Power (2021)
Moto G Stylus (2021)
Moto G Stylus 5G (2021)
Moto G10 (2021)
Moto G10 Power (2021)
Moto G20 (2021)
Moto G30 (2021)
Moto G40 Fusion (2021)
Moto G50 (2021)
Moto G50 5G (2021)
Moto G60 (2021)
Moto G60S (2021)
Moto G100 (2021)
Moto G Power (2022)
Moto G 5G (2022)
Moto G Stylus (2022)
Moto G Stylus 5G (2022)
Moto G31 (2022)
Moto G41 (2022)
Moto G51 5G (2022)
Moto G71 5G (2022)
Moto G200 5G (2022)
Moto G22 (2022)
Moto G52 (2022)
Moto G82 (2022)
Moto G62 (2022)
Moto G32 (2022)
Moto G72 (2022)
Moto G Play (2023)

Moto M

Moto M is mid-range.
Moto M (2016)

Motorola One

Motorola One is mid-range.
Motorola One (2018)
Motorola One Power (2018)
Motorola One Vision (2019)
Motorola One Action (2019)
Motorola One Zoom (2019)
Motorola One Macro (2019)
Motorola One Hyper (2019)
Motorola One Fusion+ (2020)
Motorola One Fusion (2020)
Motorola One 5G Ace (2021)

Moto X

Moto X is mid-range to high-end.
Moto X (1st generation) (2013)
Moto X (2nd generation) (2014)
Moto X Play (2015)
Moto X Style (2015)
Moto X4 (2017)

Moto Z

Moto Z is mid-range to high-end.
Moto Z (2016)
Moto Z Play (2016)
Moto Z Force (2016)
Moto Z2 Play 
Moto Z2 Force Edition (2017)
Moto Z3 (2018)
Moto Z3 Play (2018)
Moto Z4 (2019)

Smartwatches

Moto 360 
 Moto 360 (1st generation) (2014)
 Moto 360 (2nd generation) (2015)
 Moto 360 (3rd generation) (2019)

See also
Lists of mobile computers
Samsung Galaxy
List of Huawei phones
Products of Xiaomi
Oppo phones

References 

Lenovo

Lists of mobile phones
Motorola Moto